Tibtenga-Fulbé is a village in the Nassere Department of Bam Province in northern Burkina Faso. It has a population of 162.

References

Populated places in the Centre-Nord Region
Bam Province